Colchagua is a Chilean village located northwest of Palmilla, Colchagua Province, O'Higgins Region.

References

Populated places in Colchagua Province